YDL may refer to:

Yellow Dog Linux, an open source Linux distribution for the PowerPC
Dease Lake Airport, the IATA airport code
Youth Defense League, a New York Hardcore band